Ashland USD 220 is a public unified school district headquartered in Ashland, Kansas, United States.  The district includes the communities of Ashland, Englewood, Sitka, and nearby rural areas.

Schools

The school district operates the following schools:
 Ashland Junior/Senior High School.
 Ashland Elementary School.

History
Brian Pekarek served as the superintendent and principal from circa 2013-2014 until circa 2015–2016. Calvin Jones served as the superintendent and principal for the 2015–2016 school year.  Jones chose not to continue his term, and he left his job in April 2016 due to a family emergency. Mary Clarkin of The Hutchinson News stated that this happened "abruptly".

The high school is ranked as division 1A by the Kansas athletic association.

See also
 Kansas State Department of Education
 Kansas State High School Activities Association
 List of high schools in Kansas
 List of unified school districts in Kansas

References

External links
 

School districts in Kansas
Clark County, Kansas